John Heywood was an English writer.

John Heywood may also refer to:

John Heywood (MP), member of parliament for Lancaster in 1554
John B. Heywood (photographer)
John B. Heywood (engineer)
John D. Heywood, photographer
John Pemberton Heywood (1803–1877), banker from Liverpool, England

See also
John Haywood (disambiguation)
John Hayward (disambiguation)